A32, A 32, A.32 or A-32 may refer to:
 Aero A.32, a Czech ground attack aircraft built before World War II
 Brewster XA-32, an American ground attack aircraft from World War II 
 Focke-Wulf A 32, a 1930 German small airliner 
 HLA-A32, a human serotype
 Junkers A 32, a 1926 German mailplane
 Aeroprakt A-32 Vixxen, Ukrainian two-seat, high-wing, tricycle gear ultralight aircraft.
 A-32 medium tank, a prototype for the T-34
 A32, German A class torpedo boat, later served as "ENS Sulev (torpedo boat)" in the Estonian Navy and as "Amethyst" in the Soviet Navy
 The Nissan A32 mid-size sedan platform, used by the Nissan Maxima, Cefiro, Infiniti I30 and Renault Samsung SM5.
 Samsung Galaxy A32, an Android smartphone by Samsung

See also 
 English Opening, in the Encyclopaedia of Chess Openings
 The FAA location identification code for Butte Valley Airport

Roads 
 A32 road (England), a road in Hampshire connecting Gosport and Alton
 A32 motorway (France), a proposed road to connect the border with Luxembourg and Toul
 
 A32 road (Isle of Man), a road connecting Port Erin and Ballasalla road
 Autostrada A32 (Italy), a road connecting Turin and Bardonecchia
 A32 motorway (Netherlands), a road connecting Meppel and Leeuwarden 
 A32 motorway (Spain), a road connecting Jaén and  Albacete
 A32 road (Sri Lanka), a road connecting Navankuli-Mannar
 Barrier Highway (numbered A32), a highway in New South Wales and South Australia, Australia
 Great Western Highway, part of which is numbered A32, a highway in New South Wales, Australia